Kyle Lavince Lightbourne (born 29 September 1968) is a Bermudian professional footballer who played as a forward for Scarborough, Walsall, Coventry City, Fulham, Stoke City, Swindon Town, Cardiff City, Macclesfield Town and Hull City. At international level, he made 40 appearances for the Bermuda national team scoring 16 goals.

Club career
Lightbourne was born in Hamilton, Bermuda and played for PHC Zebras before moving to England to play for Scarborough at the age of 23. He played 21 times for Scarborough before joining Walsall in September 1993. Lightbourne soon struck up a partnership with Kevin Wilson and the pair became prolific goalscorers and earned Walsall some success. He scored 9 goals in 41 appearances in 1993–94 before scoring 27 goals in 1994–95 as Walsall gained promotion. He scored 24 goals in 1995–96 and 25 in 1996–97.

This earned him a lucrative move to Premier League side Coventry City for a fee of £500,000. However his chances at Highfield Road were limited and after making only 7 appearances plus a loan spell at Fulham he moved to Stoke City in February 1998. He didn't get off to the best of starts with Stoke as he struggled with illness and form as Stoke suffered relegation from the First Division in 1997–98. He improved in 1998–99, netting eight goals. In 1999–2000 Lightbourne scored 10 goals in 52 appearances as Stoke reached the play-offs where they lost to Gillingham. He played in the 2000 Football League Trophy Final at Wembley as Stoke beat Bristol City 2–1. In 2000–01 he found his chances of first team football more restricted but still managed five goals in 28 appearances. In the latter part of the season he spent spells on loan at Swindon Town and Cardiff City.

He was released by Stoke in the summer of 2001 and after a brief unsuccessful spell in Sweden with IFK Norrköping he played two seasons with Macclesfield Town and had a short loan spell at Hull City before returning to Bermuda.

In 2007, Lightbourne joined Shaun Goater as part of the management team of USL side Bermuda Hogges, making 12 appearances for the team. He officially retired from football in 2009.

International career
Lightbourne made his debut for Bermuda in 1989 and represented his country in 11 FIFA World Cup qualification matches.

His final international match was a June 2004 World Cup qualification match against El Salvador.

Managerial career
Lightbourne was coach at PHC Zebras before resigning in summer 2011. In June 2012, Lightbourne was named manager of local side Robin Hood. He missed out on a place at the Walsall bench in 2013. Lightbourne became manager of the Bermuda national team on 8 September 2017 replacing Andrew Bascome.

Cricket career
Lightbourne was a member of the ICC Associates squad at the inaugural 1988 Youth Cricket World Cup. He played five games for Bermuda at the 1990 ICC Trophy, during which he took 11 wickets at an average of 16.81. He was part of a Bermuda side that played the touring Australians in 1991.

Career statistics

Managerial statistics

Honours
Walsall
 Third Division runner-up: 1994–95

Stoke City
 Football League Trophy: 1999–2000

Individual
 PFA Team of the Year: 1994–95 Third Division

References

External links
 
 
 
 

1968 births
Living people
People from Hamilton Parish
Association football forwards
Bermudian cricketers
Bermudian footballers
Bermuda international footballers
PHC Zebras players
Scarborough F.C. players
Walsall F.C. players
Coventry City F.C. players
Fulham F.C. players
Stoke City F.C. players
Swindon Town F.C. players
Cardiff City F.C. players
Macclesfield Town F.C. players
Hull City A.F.C. players
Bermuda Hogges F.C. players
Bermudian expatriate footballers
Expatriate footballers in England
Expatriate footballers in Wales
Bermudian expatriate sportspeople in England
Premier League players
English Football League players
USL Second Division players
Bermudian football managers
2019 CONCACAF Gold Cup managers
Bermudian expatriate sportspeople in Wales
Bermudian expatriate sportspeople in Sweden
Expatriate footballers in Sweden